The Detroit Motor City Mustangs were a professional roller hockey team based in Detroit, Michigan, United States that played in Roller Hockey International. Their only season was in 1995, first game played against the Buffalo Stampede at The Aud in Buffalo, NY on June 12. First home game was against the Minnesota Blue Ox on June 16.

 
Sports teams in Detroit
Roller Hockey International teams
1995 establishments in Michigan
1995 disestablishments in Michigan
1995 in sports in Michigan
Sports clubs established in 1995
Sports clubs disestablished in 1995